The 2014 Atlantic Coast Conference men's soccer season was the 62nd season of men's varsity soccer in the conference. It marked the arrival of the Louisville Cardinals men's soccer program, who joined the ACC from the American Athletic Conference. The Maryland Terrapins men's soccer program, who were both the defending regular season and tournament champions, departed the conference for the Big Ten Conference.

Changes from 2013 

 Louisville will be joining the conference, and will also be opening the new Dr. Mark and Cindy Lynn Stadium, a 5,300-seat on-campus facility. 
 Maryland will be leaving the conference for the Big Ten.
 The ACC adopted a divisional format (Atlantic and Coastal) similar to what they did for other sports, allowing for regular season division winners to be recognized as well.  All full-time members were in their respective divisions, while Notre Dame was assigned to the Coastal Division to balance the conference at six teams apiece in each division.

Teams

Stadiums and locations

Personnel

ACC Tournament 

The 2014 ACC Men's Soccer Tournament, was held from November 5–16, 2014. 1st round and quarterfinal games were held at campus sites based on higher seed, while the semifinals and finals were held at WakeMed Soccer Park in Cary, North Carolina. The Clemson Tigers won the tournament to earn their 3rd ACC tournament championship and first since 2001.  The tournament win also accounted for the Tigers' 14th official ACC championship, as the Tigers had won 11 conference titles in regular season play prior to the start of the ACC tournament in 1987.

NCAA tournament

Seven ACC teams earned bids to the 2014 NCAA Division I Men's Soccer Tournament, led by defending national champion Notre Dame earning the #1 seed in the tournament.  The Virginia Cavaliers, #16 seed in the tournament, would eventually win their 7th National Championship as a program and first since 2009.

See also 

 Atlantic Coast Conference
 2014 ACC Men's Soccer Tournament
 2014 NCAA Division I men's soccer season
 2014 in American soccer

References 

 
2014 NCAA Division I men's soccer season